The 1965–66 Scottish League Cup was the twentieth season of Scotland's second football knockout competition. The competition was won by Celtic, who defeated Rangers in the Final.

First round

Group 1

Group 2

Group 3

Group 4

Group 5

Group 6

Group 7

Group 8

Group 9

Supplementary Round

First Leg

Second Leg

Quarter-finals

First Leg

Second Leg

Semi-finals

Ties

Replays

Final

References

General

Specific

Lea
1965-66